Bottoms Up is a 1960 British comedy film.

It stars Jimmy Edwards in a spin-off of his TV comedy series Whack-O!, playing the seedy, alcoholic, cane-wielding headmaster of Chiselbury School, a fictional British public school. Screenplay was by Michael Pertwee, with additional dialogue by Frank Muir and Denis Norden.

The cast includes juvenile actor John "Mitch" Mitchell (as Wendover), who in the late 1960s was the drummer in The Jimi Hendrix Experience, using his adult stage name, Mitch Mitchell, and it also marks the first film appearance of Richard Briers.

Plot summary
Professor Jim Edwards is the headmaster of Chiselbury School, a private boarding school for boys. A new head of the school's Board of Governors threatens to replace him as headmaster unless he can drastically improve the school's performance. When Edwards is also confronted by his bookmaker demanding money he owes and which he cannot pay, he devises a plan to deal with both problems by agreeing to accept into Chiselbury the bookmaker's son who will impersonate the heir to the throne of an oil-rich (fictional) state in the Middle East, which he hopes will persuade other parents to enrol their sons.

Cast list
Jimmy Edwards as Professor Jim Edwards
Arthur Howard as Oliver Pettigrew
Mitch Mitchell (billed as John Mitchell) as Peregrine Wendover
Martita Hunt as Lady Gore-Willoughby
Sydney Tafler as Sid Biggs
Raymond Huntley as Garrick Jones
Reginald Beckwith as Bishop Wendover
Vanda Hudson as Matron (as Vanda)
Melvyn Hayes as Cecil Biggs
Donald Hewlett as Hamley
Richard Briers as Colbourne

Critical reception
TV Guide called the film an "inane slapstick comedy set in an English boarding school ... Forced humour from a slapdash script and direction."
Allmovie wrote: "producer/director Mario Zampi knows where the laughs are and knows how to get them in full measure."
Sky movies wrote: "it could have been a lot funnier, but, even so, it's a useful record of Edwards in his element."

References

External links

1960 films
British comedy films
Films shot at Associated British Studios
Films shot in Hertfordshire
1960 comedy films
Films based on television series
Films directed by Mario Zampi
Films set in schools
1960s English-language films
1960s British films